Limelight is a type of stage lighting used during the nineteenth century.

Limelight may also refer to:

Films
Limelight Department, an Australian film studio
Limelight (1936 film), a British film starring Anna Neagle
Limelight (1952 film), a film by and starring Charlie Chaplin
Limelight, a 2009 television film starring Oded Fehr
Limelight (2011 film), a documentary by Jen Gatien and Billy Corben

Music
Limelight (club night), a classical club night at the 100 Club, Soho, London

 Limelight (group), a South Korean pop group
Limelight (magazine), an Australian music, arts and culture magazine
Limelight: The Story of Charlie Chaplin, a 2010 musical by Christopher Curtis
Limelight Records, a record label

 Limelights, fans of the band Why Don't We

Albums

 
Limelight, by Steve Taylor, 1986

Limelight (Marti Webb album), 2003

Limelight (Colin James album), 2005

Songs

 
"Limelight", by XTC from Drums and Wires, 1979
"Limelight" (Rush song), 1981
"Limelight", by the Alan Parsons Project from Stereotomy, 1985

"Limelight", by Two Hours Traffic from their 2005 self-titled debut album

"Limelight" (Alizée song), 2010

"Limelight", by Reks from Rhythmatic Eternal King Supreme, 2011
"Limelight", by Agnes, 2019

Venues
Limelight (Belfast), a nightclub and music venue
The Limelight, a chain of nightclubs
Limelight Gallery and Coffeehouse, a New York City photography gallery 1954–1961

Other uses

 Limelight (health centre), a health centre in England
 Limelight Editions, an imprint owned by book publisher Rowman & Littlefield
 Limelight Networks, a digital media content delivery network

See also
 Light (disambiguation)
 Lime (disambiguation)
The Limeliters, an American folk-singing group
 Lime Point Light, lighthouse at Lime Point
 Spotlight (disambiguation)